BEU is a three-letter acronym that may stand for:

British Empire Union, a historical union formed in the United Kingdom during World War I to support British goods
Bank Employees' Union (disambiguation), any of several trade unions
Biker Enforcement Unit, a division of the Ontario Provincial Police's organized crime section
 Bedourie Airport, with IATA code BEU
 Bundesstelle für Eisenbahnunfalluntersuchung or Federal Authority for Railway Accident Investigation, German agency investigating railway accidents.

Beu may refer to:

Beu, a Romanian village administered by Miercurea Nirajului
Beu (river), a river in southwestern Romania
The Beu Sisters, an American pop-rock girl group